William Randolph II (November 1681October 19, 1741), also known as William Randolph Jr. or Councillor Randolph, was an American planter and politician. He was the Treasurer of Virginia and the oldest child of William Randolph and Mary Isham.

Early life and family
Randolph was born to William Randolph and Mary Isham on the Turkey Island Plantation along the James River in Henrico County, Virginia in 1681 and resided there his entire life. He married Elizabeth Beverley (the daughter of Peter Beverley, a Speaker of the House of Burgesses and Treasurer of Virginia) around 1705 and the couple had seven children, five of which reached adulthood:
Beverley Randolph (born ) married Elizabeth Lightfoot and had no children.
Peter Randolph (born ) married Robert Bolling Jr.'s daughter, Lucille Bolling. They had four children, including Beverley Randolph, the eighth Governor of Virginia and Ann Bolling Randolph Fitzhugh, William Fitzhugh's wife. 
William Randolph III, owner of Wilton plantation house, married Anne Harrison, the daughter of Benjamin Harrison IV, and had eight surviving children.
Mary Randolph (1704–1777) married Joseph Rentfro.
Elizabeth "Betty" Randolph (born ) married Colonel John Chiswell and had at least four daughters who reached adulthood, including Susan R. Chiswell, the wife of John Robinson, the 32nd Speaker of the House of Burgesses.

Randolph was a great-uncle of United States President Thomas Jefferson.

His brother, Richard Randolph married Major John Bolling's daughter, Jane Bolling, also a lineal descendant of Pocahontas. They had six children.

His brother, John Randolph married Susanna Beverley (daughter of Peter Beverley, Speaker of the House of Burgesses and Treasurer of Colony of Virginia) on July 20, 1738.

Career
Randolph served as Clerk of House from 1703 to 1712. He served as Treasurer of the Colony of Virginia in 1737.

Ancestry

Westham, Virginia
The town of Westham, Virginia was established on land that had been owned by Randolph. When Randolph died, his son Beverley inherited Westham Plantation and planned to create the town of Westham on part of it to facilitate trade in the Piedmont region of Virginia. After Beverley's sudden death, Peter Randolph inherited his brother's land and completed work on the project – renaming the town "Beverley" in honor of his older brother – with help from William Cabell and Peter Jefferson. Jefferson was one of a number of important Virginians, including Carter Braxton, Joshua Fry, John Hunter, Robert Rose, and William Stith. who purchased lots in the new town. Peter Randolph eventually sold Westham Plantation to his younger brother, William, who in turn sold the property to William Byrd III.

See also
First Families of Virginia
Randolph family of Virginia

Notes

References

External links

Painting of William Randolph II of Turkey Island, 1755 by John Wollaston at the Virginia Historical Society

1681 births
1741 deaths
American people of English descent
American planters
American slave owners
People from Henrico County, Virginia
William II
Beverley family of Virginia
18th-century American politicians